The Rock Island Depot is a historic railroad station located at 201 East 10th Street in Sioux Falls, South Dakota. The station opened in 1886 to serve the Burlington, Cedar Rapids and Northern Railway, a predecessor of the Rock Island. The ashlar and wood building has a Richardsonian Romanesque design with a side-facing stone gable and an octagonal turret. The interior of the station includes a waiting room, a ticket office, and the station agent's quarters. As the railroad network spread through South Dakota, Sioux Falls became the state's primary commercial and transportation hub due to its established station. The station served passenger trains through Sioux Falls until 1970.

The station was added to the National Register of Historic Places on February 15, 1974.

References

Railway stations on the National Register of Historic Places in South Dakota
Romanesque Revival architecture in South Dakota
Railway stations in the United States opened in 1886
National Register of Historic Places in Sioux Falls, South Dakota
1886 establishments in Dakota Territory
Sioux Falls
Former railway stations in South Dakota